The men's 4 x 100 metres relay event at the 2007 European Athletics U23 Championships was held in Debrecen, Hungary, at Gyulai István Atlétikai Stadion on 15 July.

Medalists

Results

Final
15 July

Heats
15 July
Qualified: first 2 in each heat and 4 best to the Final

Heat 1

Heat 2

Participation
According to an unofficial count, 58 athletes from 14 countries participated in the event.

 (4)
 (4)
 (4)
 (5)
 (4)
 (5)
 (4)
 (4)
 (4)
 (4)
 (4)
 (4)
 (4)
 (4)

References

4 x 100 metres relay
Relays at the European Athletics U23 Championships